Carl Lange or Karl Lange may refer to:

 Carl Lange (physician) (1834–1900), Danish physician
 Carl Lange (actor) (1909–1999), German film actor
 Carl Lange (architect) (1828–1900), Danish architect
 Carl Viggo Lange (1904–1999), Norwegian physician and politician
 Karl Otto Lange (1903–1973), American atmospheric scientist